Elmer Miller may refer to:

 Elmer Miller (outfielder) (1890–1944), American baseball player for the St. Louis Cardinals, New York Yankees, and Boston Red Sox
 Elmer Miller (pitcher) (1903–1987), American baseball player for the Philadelphia Phillies
 Elmer S. Miller (b. 1931) anthropologist and author specializing in the Gran Chaco